Vaughn Chipeur (born December 21, 1984) is a former Canadian figure skater and figure-skating coach. He currently resides in Edmonton, Alberta. Chipeur is also the Figure Skate Technical Representative and Brand Ambassador for TRUE Temper Sports.

He is the 2009 & 2010 Canadian silver medalist and won the bronze medal at the 2006 Nebelhorn Trophy.

Chipeur began skating at age six. At the 2010 Canadian Figure Skating Championships, he was nominated to represent Canada at the 2010 Winter Olympics. He placed 23rd in the men's event. On July 15, 2010, Chipeur announced his retirement from competitive figure skating.

Competitive programs

Competitive results 
GP: Grand Prix; JGP: Junior Grand Prix

References

External links

 

1984 births
Canadian male single skaters
Figure skaters from Edmonton
Sportspeople from Lloydminster
Living people
Figure skaters at the 2010 Winter Olympics
Olympic figure skaters of Canada